Loutété (can also be written as Lutete) is a small town in southeastern Congo (Brazzaville).

Transport 
It is served by a station on the  narrow gauge Congo-Ocean Railway.

Industry 
It has a cement works.

See also 
 Railway stations in Congo

References 

Bouenza Department
Populated places in the Republic of the Congo